In the European Union, the Conference of Presidents is a governing body of the European Parliament. The body is responsible for the organisation of Parliament, its administrative matters and agenda.

The Conference consists of the President of Parliament, the chairmen of the political groups (who may arrange to be represented by a member of their group) and a representative of the Non-Inscrits (independent members). The Conference of Presidents meets approximately twice a month.

Current members

Rules of procedure

References

External links
More Detailed Information in 23 languages at europarl.europa.eu
Rules of Procedure
 

European Parliament